CSBK may refer to:

 China Superbike Championship, a motorcycle racing championship
 Canadian Superbike Championship, a motorcycle racing championship
 Clifton Savings Bancorp of Clifton, New Jersey, USA; a retail savings bank